The Princeton Tigers baseball team is a varsity intercollegiate athletic team of Princeton University in Princeton, New Jersey, United States. The team is a member of the Ivy League, which is part of the National Collegiate Athletic Association's Division I. Princeton's first baseball team was fielded in 1864. The team plays its home games at Bill Clarke Field in Princeton, New Jersey. The Tigers are coached by Scott Bradley.

The Tigers won 10 Eastern Intercollegiate Baseball League championships, and have claimed 8 Ivy League titles, advancing to the NCAA Division I Baseball Championship 12 times and the College World Series once, in 1951.  Baseball was the first varsity sport at Princeton, and Bill Clarke was the first paid coach at the university.  The Tigers also appeared in the first televised college baseball game in 1939 against Columbia.

Notable players
Mike Chernoff – baseball general manager of the Cleveland Indians
Mike Ford- Seattle Mariners First Baseman

See also
List of NCAA Division I baseball programs

References

External links